Nicholas J. H. Coles (born 1947 in Leeds, England) is a British-American scholar in working-class literature and composition studies, and is Associate Professor of English and Director of Composition at the University of Pittsburgh.

Life
He holds BA and MA degrees from Oxford University (Coles was educated at Balliol College, where he was awarded a first-class undergraduate degree), and he holds MA and PhD degrees from the State University of New York at Buffalo. His 1981 PhD dissertation was The Making of a Monster: The Working Class in the Industrial Novels and Social Investigations of 1830–1855.

He writes and teaches about literacy, pedagogy, contemporary poetry, and teacher-research. His best-known book, Working Classics (1990), co-edited with Peter Oresick, was the first to highlight a seldom acknowledged working-class presence within contemporary American poetry.

He is also field director of the National Writing Project, based at the University of California at Berkeley. He directed until 2002 the Western Pennsylvania Writing Project, a site of the National Writing Project, working to improve students’ writing and academic performance in K-12 schools.

Family
He has lived in the United States since the 1970s, primarily in Pittsburgh, Pennsylvania.
He used to live with author and painter Jennifer Matesa and their 12-year-old son Jonathan in Pittsburgh, Pennsylvania.

Works

References

1947 births
Living people
Writers from Pittsburgh
University of Pittsburgh faculty
Working-class literature